Space Chimps is a platform video game based on the film of the same name. It was published by Brash Entertainment and was released for the PlayStation 2, Wii, Nintendo DS, Xbox 360 (not compatible with Xbox One), and Microsoft Windows in 2008.

Plot
Similar to the film, Ham III, grandson of Ham, the first chimpanzee in space, teams up with fellow spacemates Luna and Titan on a space adventure to an unknown planet.

Gameplay 
The player plays two characters, Ham and Luna, defeating enemies in order to defeat Zartog and save their friend, collecting gumdrop-shaped objects called Globhoppers as well as bananas along the way. 

Collecting enough Globhoppers and bananas unlocks rewards such as character concepts, artwork, and videos as well as a deleted scene from the movie in which the director of the film, Kirk DeMicco, plays with actual monkeys.

Reception
The game received “mixed or average reviews” on all platforms except the PlayStation 2 version, which received “generally unfavorable reviews” according to the review aggregation website Metacritic.

References

External links
 
 

Space Chimps
2008 video games
Gamebryo games
PlayStation 2 games
Wii games
Nintendo DS games
Xbox 360 games
Windows games
Video games about primates
Video games based on films
Video games developed in Australia
Video games set on fictional planets
Platform games
WayForward games
Multiplayer and single-player video games
Wicked Witch Software games
Brash Entertainment games
3D platform games